Crawford Fairbanks Parker (20 September 1906 – 15 February 1986) was an American politician from the U.S. state of Indiana. Between 1957 and 1961 he served as Lieutenant Governor of Indiana.

Life
Crawford Parker was born in Danville, Indiana. He joined the Republican Party and between 1952 and 1952 he was the Secretary of State of Indiana. In 1956 he was elected to the office of the Lieutenant Governor of Indiana and he served in this position between 14 January 1957 and 9 January 1961 when his term ended. In this function he was the deputy of Governor Harold W. Handley and he presided over the Indiana Senate. Crawford Parker died on 15 February 1986 in Fort Lauderdale in Florida. In 1960 he ran unsuccessfully for the governor’s office of his state.

1906 births
1986 deaths
Lieutenant Governors of Indiana
Indiana Republicans
Secretaries of State of Indiana
People from Danville, Indiana